Brugnens is a commune in the Gers department in southwestern France.

Geography 
The river Auroue forms all of the commune's eastern border.

Population

See also
Communes of the Gers department

References

Communes of Gers